Julie Anne Genter  (born 17 December 1979) is an American-born New Zealand politician who is a member of the House of Representatives representing the Green Party of Aotearoa New Zealand. She served as the Minister for Women, Associate Minister for Health and Associate Minister for Transport during the first term of the Sixth Labour Government. She holds dual citizenship of New Zealand and the United States.

Early life and education
Genter was born in Rochester, Minnesota, United States, in 1979, and grew up in Los Angeles, California. She gained a BA in philosophy from the University of California, Berkeley in 2003. She moved to France where in 2005 she obtained a post-graduate certificate in International Political Studies from the Institut d'études politiques in Paris. She gained a Masters of Planning Practice from the University of Auckland in 2008.

Professional life
Genter has worked as a transportation planner since coming to New Zealand in 2006. She was first employed by Sinclair Knight Merz, then by MRCagney (formerly McCormick Rankin Cagney) from 2008.

She is recognised in the transportation industry as an expert on parking policy and its economic and transport effects, and has advised numerous councils in Australasia on this topic.  She has given many presentations at conferences on the subject (for example 2008 New Zealand Society for Sustainability Engineering and Science, 2008 IPENZ Transportation Conference and 2010 Local Government Transport Forum), and appeared on TVNZ's Breakfast programme and Kim Hill's Saturday Morning programme on Radio New Zealand National.

Member of Parliament

In opposition, 2011–2017

In July 2015 Genter became the third ever female MP to hold a finance portfolio, alongside the Transport and Youth portfolios. The departure of long-standing Health Spokesperson Kevin Hague in September 2016 led to her taking on the Health portfolio, keeping Transport, Youth, Auckland Issues, and Associate Finance.

As an MP, Genter criticised the Fifth National government for spending billions of dollars on motorways, called for a nationwide mental health inquiry, and questioned Health Minister Jonathan Coleman on his use of a Coca-Cola funded study. In January 2017 Genter criticised former Green Party issues director Laila Harré, stating that the reason Harré gave for resigning from the Greens was not factual. Genter quickly apologised to Harré stating "regret any slight to your integrity".

In late 2016 Genter announced that she would be putting her name forward for the Green Party nomination for the Mount Albert by-election, which she gained in January. Genter came second in the February 2017 by-election after Jacinda Ardern.

Genter stated that she rebuffed an approach by Gareth Morgan to waka-jump to his The Opportunities Party (TOP) in July 2017, though TOP denied any "formal" approach had been made.

In Government, 2017–present
Genter was appointed Minister for Women and Associate Minister of both Health and Transport in the Green-supported Labour–New Zealand First coalition government. Genter chose to take her oath to the Crown in Te Reo Māori along with other members, for which she was praised by political colleagues and members of the public.

In 2018 Genter added Civil Aviation to her portfolio as Associate Minister of Transport, after Transport Minister Phil Twyford was reported for making a phone call from an airplane preparing for departure.

Genter was re-elected to Parliament on the Green party list in the October 2020 New Zealand election, when the Greens earned 7.9% of the popular vote. Labour formed a majority government, and invited only the co-leaders of the Green Party to join Cabinet. Genter therefore stood down from her ministerial portfolios, but was granted retention of the title "The Honourable" for life in recognition of her term as a member of the Executive Council.

Genter was named Green Party spokesperson for Building and Construction, COVID-19 Response, Customs, Energy and Resources, Finance, Infrastructure, Local Government, State Owned Enterprises, Transport, and Urban Development.

Personal life
On 18 February 2018, Genter announced that she was pregnant, having previously revealed that she had suffered a series of miscarriages. In August Genter gave birth to a baby boy, announcing the news on her social media. She made international headlines after she and her partner cycled to Auckland Hospital for her labour to be induced.

In early 2019, Genter and her partner Peter Nunns moved to live in Wellington. In November 2021, she once again cycled to hospital to give birth to her second child, a daughter.

Views and positions

Women
In her three years as Minister for Women, Genter worked to reduce the public-sector gender pay gap, and increased funding for primary maternity services.

Transport incentives and funding
Genter and the Green Party support a "feebate" scheme introduced by the Labour-led government to encourage a shift from petrol vehicles with high emissions of polluting material to electric and plug-in hybrid vehicles.  When serving as Associate Minister of Transport in the previous term of government, Genter had been involved in the development of a similar policy which was blocked by New Zealand First. The scheme will see the sale of high-emitting vehicles, including New Zealand's best selling car the Ford Ranger being subject to a fee of up to $5,000 to fund rebates for electric and plug-in hybrid vehicles. Genter said on Twitter that the Ford Ranger was advertised as "all about lifestyle and status for men who want to feel more masculine," in the context of debate as to whether such vehicles were used for work purposes or as "a fashion choice for city dwellers." Genter later acknowledged that Ford Rangers are used for work by some, and said: "I was tweeting about how they are marketed, not a statement about everyone using one."

Genter negotiated for the Government to remove fringe benefit tax on employer payments for public transport, to match the tax exemption for work-provided carparks, and introduced subsidies for e-bikes.

Genter has been a strong supporter of better passenger rail between Auckland, Hamilton and Tauranga. As chair of the government's Infrastructure Committee, she promoted further investment in regional passenger rail services.

During the COVID-19 lockdown of 2020, Genter increased funding for tactical urbanism, enabling rapid expansion of cycle lanes and footpaths.

Transport safety
As Associate Minister for Transport, Genter introduced speed limits around all schools, supported by funding for signs and speed cameras.

Health
As Associate Minister for Health, Genter introduced government funding for spouses, partners and parents who care for a family member with disabilities.

Abortion
Genter voted in favor of legislation that decriminalises abortion.

Cannabis
Genter supports legalising while also regulating the use of cannabis.

References

External links
 Profile at Green Party of Aotearoa New Zealand website
 Profile at New Zealand Parliament website

1979 births
Living people
American expatriates in France
American emigrants to New Zealand
Members of the New Zealand House of Representatives
Green Party of Aotearoa New Zealand MPs
New Zealand feminists
New Zealand list MPs
Government ministers of New Zealand
Politicians from Rochester, Minnesota
Women members of the New Zealand House of Representatives
21st-century New Zealand politicians
University of California, Berkeley alumni
University of Auckland alumni
21st-century New Zealand women politicians
Candidates in the 2017 New Zealand general election
Women government ministers of New Zealand
Candidates in the 2020 New Zealand general election